Bryce Michael Hall (born August 14, 1999) is an American social media personality known for his TikTok and YouTube videos. , his TikTok account has 21.8 million followers, and his YouTube channel has 3 million subscribers.

Early life 
Hall was born on August 14, 1999, and he was raised by his mother Lisa in Ellicott City, Maryland.

Career

YouTube/ TikTok career 
Hall started his social media career on YouNow at the age of 15. He originally started live streaming in an effort to make friends after being bullied. In late 2014, he started gaining traction on the social media platforms Vine and Musical.ly, accumulating over 30,000 followers on Vine before it was shut down at the end of 2016.

He started his YouTube channel in 2015.

In 2018, Hall moved from his home in Maryland to Los Angeles to pursue his career. In 2019, he was one of the social-media celebrities featured in the documentary Jawline, which detailed his career beginnings and his legal scandals with his former manager, Michael Weist.

In January 2020, Hall and five other social media personalities moved into the Sway House, a Bel Air mansion owned by the talent management company TalentX Entertainment. There, they committed to creating viral content for multiple social media platforms, especially TikTok. In February 2021, TalentX and Sway House co-founder Michael Gruen confirmed that the Sway House had been discontinued.

In April 2022, it was reported that Hall would star in Skill House, a horror film written and directed by Josh Stolberg and financed by Ryan Kavanaugh's Proxima Studios.

Street fighting career 
Before his match against Austin McBroom, in an interview, Bryce Hall claimed that he had participated in "over 40 street fights." Hall claims that he has yet to lose in any street fight.

Boxing career 

Hall and YouTuber Austin McBroom began fighting on Twitter and a match was booked between them. On March 18, 2021, the undercard of the match was turned into a new event called YouTubers vs. TikTokers, with Hall representing the TikTok side. At the press conference for the event, a fight between McBroom and Hall broke out on stage. On June 12, 2021, McBroom beat Hall by TKO. Hall would say in the post-interview, "I'm not a fighter, I never claimed to be a fighter." Later on a Keemstar interview Hall stated he meant to say he isn't a boxer.

Boxing record

Personal life 
Hall moved to Los Angeles, California in 2018, later becoming the creator of the Sway House. In 2020, Hall dated TikToker Addison Rae. They broke up the following year.

Controversies 
In June 2020, his tweet about "straight TikTok" and hetero-phobia created controversy. Critics alleged Hall had mocked the LGBT community. He deleted the tweet minutes later and issued an apology to the public on Twitter.

Legal issues

Lawsuit with previous management 
In 2017, Hall falsely accused his former manager Michael Weist of sexual assault. On November 1, 2017, Hall tweeted out accusing Weist of hacking his Twitter account, and he also claimed that Weist touched him inappropriately, writing "Managers who touch their clients in ways they don't wanna be touched hide the truth by hacking their Twitter accounts."  In Hulu's "Jawline," Weist is shown replying to a text about suing Hall by stating that he would sue his former client for $5 million. Weist filed a lawsuit against Hall for defamation. The case was settled outside of court, and Hall publicly apologized to Weist, stating "I made some harsh statements about Michael and regret making those statements, including any suggestion of sexual assault. I am sorry for what happened and I am glad it is over."

Violation of COVID-19 safety measures 
On August 19, 2020, Mayor of Los Angeles Eric Garcetti authorized the Los Angeles Department of Water and Power to shut off Hall's home utility services for violating the city's social distancing measures against the COVID-19 pandemic, which include a ban on house parties with large gatherings, which Hall allegedly violated with a celebration of his 21st birthday after several warnings from the Los Angeles Police Department to cease his parties. On August 28, he was charged by the Los Angeles City Attorney with a misdemeanor violating the Safer L.A. health order and the city's “Party House Ordinance”.

May arrest 
On May 25, 2020, Hall, along with fellow TikTok star Jaden Hossler, was arrested in Lee County, Texas on drug charges. He was charged with a misdemeanor for possession of marijuana, and posted $5,000 bail the same day.

Altercation and lawsuit 
In October 2020, footage obtained by TMZ showed Hall and some of his friends in an altercation with an employee of the Cinco restaurant in Los Angeles. Several months later in April 2021, the restaurant co-owner, Hernan Fernando sued Hall for "battery; assault; intentional infliction of emotional distress; and engaging in acts of violence motivated by race, national origin, citizenship, immigration status and primary language."

References 

1999 births
American TikTokers
American YouTubers
Living people
People from Ellicott City, Maryland
Vine (service) celebrities
YouTube boxers